Gregor Hoop (born 22 May 1967) is a Liechtensteiner former alpine skier who competed in the 1988 Winter Olympics.

References

External links
 

1964 births
Living people
Liechtenstein male alpine skiers
Olympic alpine skiers of Liechtenstein
Alpine skiers at the 1988 Winter Olympics
Place of birth missing (living people)